UPM may refer to:

 Ultra-pure metal
 UPM (company), UPM-Kymmene Oyj, a pulp and paper company
 Union pour la méditerrannée, Mediterranean Community
 Union for a Popular Movement, opposition party of France 
 Unit production manager, someone responsible for administration duties on a film
 Units per em
 Unix Programmers Manual
 Unlawful possession of marijuana
 User profile management
 The Unemployed Peoples' Movement in South Africa.
 Uganda Patriotic Movement - Defunct political party in Uganda.
 Upminster station, London, National Rail station code
 Urapakkam railway station, Chennai, India, Indian Railways station code

Universities
 , a public university in Madrid, Spain
 University of Putra Malaysia, a public research university in Selangor, Malaysia
 University of Petroleum and Minerals, a public university in Dhahran, Saudi Arabia
 University of the Philippines Manila, oldest of the eight constituent universities of the University of the Philippines System
 University of Pennsylvania Museum of Archaeology and Anthropology a museum at the University of Pennsylvania